Londinières is a commune in the Seine-Maritime department in the Normandy region in northern France.

Geography

Population

Places of interest
 The church, dating from the sixteenth century.
 The nineteenth century Hôtel de Ville.
 The eighteenth century chapel of Saint-Melaine at Boissay

See also
Communes of the Seine-Maritime department

References

Communes of Seine-Maritime